Cercospora apii f.sp. clerodendri is a fungal plant pathogen.

References

External links
 USDA ARS Fungal Database

apii f.sp. clerodendri
Fungal plant pathogens and diseases
Forma specialis taxa